The AACTA International Award for Best Actor is an award that is presented by the Australian Academy of Cinema and Television Arts (AACTA), for a performance by a male actor in a film made outside Australia. It was first handed out by the Academy after its establishment in 2011 by the Australian Film Institute (AFI), to replace the AFI International Award for Best Actor (2005–2010). The winners and nominees for 2011 were determined by a jury. The award was presented at the inaugural AACTA International Awards in Los Angeles, on 27 January 2012.

Winners and nominees
In the following table, the winner is marked in a separate colour, and highlighted in boldface; the nominees are those that are not highlighted or in boldface.

2010s

2020s

See also
AACTA Award for Best Actor in a Leading Role
AACTA Awards

References

External links
The Australian Academy of Cinema and Television Arts Official website

A
AACTA Award winners
Film awards for lead actor